George Hanbury Field (1 March 1834 – 24 July 1901) was an English cricketer. He played five first-class matches between 1856 and 1859.

Early and professional life
Field was born at Clapham in 1834, the son of George and Susanna Field. His father was a hop merchant who later became a Justice of the Peace (JP) and expanded Ashurst Park, a mansion near Tunbridge Wells in Kent. Field was educated at Eton College and University College, Oxford where he studied law. After graduating in 1858 he was called to the bar at Lincoln's Inn in London and worked as a barrister and served as a JP. He later became a brewery owner and bank director after inheriting Ashurst Park in 1875.

Cricket
Although he did not make the Eton side, Field was a keen amateur cricketer and played for a wide variety of sides, occasionally playing alongside his brother Barclay. He played for Oxford University sides, although not in first-class matches, and later for MCC and sides such as Harlequins, Old Etonians and Sevenoaks Vine. He played in five first-class matches, making his senior debut for a Gentlemen of Kent and Sussex side during the 1856 Canterbury Cricket Week. Three of his four first-class matches for Kent were played on Higher Common Ground at Tunbridge Wells; he made his highest first-class score of 11 runs on the ground in his final senior appearance in 1859.

The same year Field attended the meeting which established a new Kent County Cricket Club at Maidstone, proposing the first President. He served on the management committee of the club between 1865 and 1870 and his father and brother, Barclay Field, were both members of the club.

Family and later life
Field married Georgina Turnour, the daughter of Edward Turnour, 4th Earl Winterton, in 1862. The couple had two sons and three daughters. After Georgina's death in 1891 he married the 18-year old Emily Hardinge, the daughter of Charles Hardinge, 2nd Viscount Hardinge, and had two sons.

Field died in July 1901 at Ashurst Park. He was aged 67. A number of houses on the Ashurst Park estate were built during Field's ownership and bear his initials. His wife memorialised him through a number of endowments to the local church, St Peter's at Fordcombe where many of the Hardinge family are buried.

Notes

References

External links
 

1834 births
1901 deaths
English cricketers
Kent cricketers
Cricketers from Greater London
Gentlemen of Kent and Sussex cricketers